PlunderChess is a commercial chess variant, first sold in 2004, in which the capturing piece is allowed to temporarily take the moving abilities of the piece taken. The game is played with colored plastic rings to mark which abilities have been adopted by pieces.

Rules 
The so-called plundering occurs when a chess piece captures an opposing chess piece and "plunders" or "acquires" additional moving capabilities directly from the piece it just captured. Plundering is optional and may be declined by the player making the capture. When plundering is elected, the capturing piece "couples" or "attaches" to itself a vest that corresponds to the moving capabilities it is acquiring from the captured piece. The plundered vest must give added moving capabilities to the piece that wears it or it will not be allowed to plunder. This means that a queen can never wear a rook vest because a queen can already make the moves of a rook and a rook vest provides no additional benefit to the queen.

The added moving capability provided by a plundered vest may be used one time only on any future move: i.e., the plundered vest may be used on its very next move or carried around and used later in the game. After a vest is used to move a chess piece on the board, it must be returned to the stand out of play. No more than one plundered vest is allowed on any one piece at a time. If a chess piece with a plundered vest makes another capture, it may upgrade to a stronger vest. If a player captures a piece with a vest, that player may take the vest it wears or a vest that represents the captured piece.

The pawn with the vest can use it to reach the last rank. In this case the pawn gets immediately promoted. However, the pieces with pawn vest cannot promote. The pawn can also move to the first rank by a vest move. But it has double-move capability only when moving from 2nd to 4th rank.

A piece with a vest can give a check (or eventually checkmate) to the opponent's king using vest-move power.

External links 
 PlunderChess - official website.
 PlunderChess: Pictures and a review by Hans L. Bodlaender.

Chess variants
1988 in chess
Board games introduced in 1988